EiffelTowers Nijmegen was a Dutch basketball club based in Nijmegen. The club played in the top-tier Eredivisie during the period 2000–2005 and won one championship in 2003. In 2005, the club merged with EBBC Den Bosch to form EiffelTowers Den Bosch.

History
In 2000 the first-division club was founded as the EiffelTowers Nijmegen and played its games in De Horstacker in Nijmegen. Marco van den Berg was hired as the team's head coach. With main sponsor Eiffel BV, the club was able to sign high quality American players which led to quick successes. In 2003, the EiffelTowers dominated in the Eredivie and team won the Dutch national championship, as well as the NBB Cup. In the playoff finals, Omniworld was swept easily, 4–0. In 2005 main sponsor Eiffel decided to move its club to Den Bosch to merge with Tulip Den Bosch. Main reason was the small arena in Nijmegen, which didn't allow the club to play in European competitions.

The following season, a new team from Nijmegen was founded in Matrixx Magixx.

Honours
Dutch Basketball League (1): 
2002–03
Dutch Cups (1):
2003
Runner-up: 2002

Season by season

Head coaches 

 Marco van den Berg: (2000–2004)
 Randy Wiel: (2004–2005)

References

Defunct basketball teams in the Netherlands
Basketball teams established in 2000
Basketball teams disestablished in 2005
Former Dutch Basketball League teams
Sports clubs in Nijmegen
History of Nijmegen